The 2010 Guzzini Challenger was a professional tennis tournament played on hard courts. This was the seventh edition of the tournament which is part of the 2010 ATP Challenger Tour. It took place in Recanati, Italy between 19 July and 25 July 2010.

ATP entrants

Seeds

 Rankings are as of July 12, 2010.

Other entrants
The following players received wildcards into the singles main draw:
  Alessandro Giannessi
  Giacomo Miccini
  Andrea Stoppini
  Federico Torresi

The following players received entry from the qualifying draw:
  George Bastl
  Olivier Charroin
  Laurynas Grigelis
  Francesco Piccari (as a Lucky Loser)
  Alexandre Renard

Champions

Singles

 Stéphane Bohli def.  Adrian Mannarino, 6–0, 3–6, 7–6(5)

Doubles

 Jamie Delgado /  Lovro Zovko def.  Charles-Antoine Brézac /  Vincent Stouff, 7–6(6), 6–1

External links
Official Site

Guzzini Challenger
Guzzini Challenger
2010 in Italian tennis